The Association for the Sociology of Religion (ASR) is an academic association with more than 700 members worldwide. It publishes a journal, Sociology of Religion, and holds meetings at the same venues and times as the American Sociological Association.

History
The ASR was founded by Catholic sociologists in Chicago in 1938 as the American Catholic Sociological Society. The organization adopted its present name in 1970, reflecting changes in the Vatican's policy that led to greater openness towards other faiths. It has long since become a base for sociological research on religion without regard to belief, creed, or religious orientation.

Activities
The association publishes a journal, Sociology of Religion, as well as a quarterly newsletter. It is the co-publisher of an annual series entitled Religion and the Social Order. The association provides research grants.

The ASR, which has over 700 members worldwide, continues its historical practice of holding its meetings at the same venues and times as the American Sociological Association, allowing mutual cross-fertilization between the two associations. Past presidents of the ASR include David G. Bromley, James T. Richardson, Eileen Barker Benton Johnson, and Christopher G. Ellison.

Presidents

 1938: Ralph A. Gallagher
 1939: Raymond W. Murray
 1940: Paul J. Mundie
 1941: Francis J. Friedel
 1942: Walter L. Willigan
 1943: Eva J. Ross
 1944: Paul Hanly Furfey
 1945: Gerald J. Schnepp
 1946: Alphonse H. Clemens
 1947: Leo J. Robinson
 1948: Franz Mueller
 1949: Robert B. Navin
 1950: Clement S. Mihanovich
 1951: Thomas P. Harte
 1952: John J. Kane
 1953: Joseph P. Fitzpatrick
 1954: C. J. Neuse
 1955: M. Jeanine Gruesser
 1956: D. Augustine McCaffrey
 1957: Allen Spitzer
 1958: John D. Donovan
 1959: Mary Edward Healy
 1960: John L. Thomas
 1961: Jack H. Curtis
 1962: Frances Jerome Woods
 1963: John E. Hughes
 1964: Paul Facey
 1965: Paul Mundy
 1966: Andrew Greeley
 1967: Donald N. Barrett
 1968: Gordon Zahn
 1969: Robert J. McNamara
 1970: Paul Reiss
 1971: Ralph Lane Jr.
 1972: Marie Augusta Neal
 1973: Thomas P. Imse
 1974: William H. Jarrett
 1975: Ruth A. Wallace
 1976: John L. Thomas
 1977: David O. Moberg
 1978: Thomas M. Gannon
 1979: Jeffrey K. Hadden
 1980: Carroll J. Bourg
 1981: Hart M. Nelsen
 1982: Meredith B. McGuire
 1983: Rodney Stark
 1984: Patrick H. McNamara
 1985: William R. Garrett
 1986: James T. Richardson
 1987: Benton Johnson
 1988: Roland Robertson
 1989: James A. Beckford
 1990: Helen Rose Ebaugh
 1991: Theodore E. Long
 1992: Edward C. Lehman
 1993: William V. D'Antonio
 1994: David G. Bromley
 1995: John H. Simpson
 1996: Nancy Ammerman
 1997: R. Stephen Warner
 1998: James R. Kelly
 1999: Nancy Nason-Clark
 2000: José Casanova
 2001: Anthony J. Blasi
 2002: Eileen Barker
 2003: Grace Davie
 2004: Joseph B. Tamney
 2005: N. J. Demerath III
 2006: Kevin J. Christiano
 2007: James D. Davidson
 2008: Mary Jo Neitz
 2009: Michele Dillon
 2010: Rhys H. Williams
 2011: Peter Beyer
 2012: Roger Finke
 2013: Fred Kniss
 2014: Christopher G. Ellison
 2015: Melissa J. Wilde
 2016: Lori G. Beaman
 2018–2019: Paula Nesbitt
 2019–present: James C. Cavendish

See also

 American Academy of Religion
 International Society for the Sociology of Religion
 Religious Research Association
 Society for the Scientific Study of Religion

References

External links
 

Organizations established in 1938
Sociological organizations